The Battle of El Maguey was a battle of the War of Mexican Independence that occurred on 2 May 1811 at El Maguey, in the State of Aguascalientes. The battle was fought between the royalist forces loyal to the Spanish crown, commanded by General Miguel Emparan, and the Mexican rebels fighting for independence from the Spanish Empire, commanded by Ignacio López Rayón. The battle resulted in a victory for the Spanish royalists.

The battle
In early May 1811, the Spanish Brigadier General, Miguel Emparan, at the head of 3,000 men with the colonels Pedro García Conde and the Count of House Rule as his second in commands, pursued the army of Ignacio López Rayón through the state of Aguascalientes. The Spanish caught up with the Mexican rebels in the area around the ranch of El Maguey on 3 May.

Rayón sent his infantry, baggage and supplies to the town of La Piedad de Cavadas, but remained in his position at El Maguey with 14 pieces of artillery and a cavalry picket to fight a rearguard action against the overwhelming advancing Spanish forces. The stand was meant to give his infantry time to escape their pursuers so they could make an organized retreat from the Spanish. General Emparan gave battle and the two armies maneuvered for position around the ranch.

Rayón took advantage of the confusion caused by the smoke and dust in the air and fled the action whilst Emparan continued his advance. In the end, the royalists were able to successfully take possession of all the rebel cannon left behind on the battlefield.

El Maguey
El Maguey
History of Aguascalientes
El Maguey
El Maguey
1811 in New Spain
May 1811 events